High Kick Through the Roof was a popular South Korean situation comedy revolving around the life of the Lee family.

Cast

Soon-jae's House

Lee Soon-jae (Lee Soon-jae)  President of the self-named food company Lee Soon-jae F&B (Food & Beverage) and family patriarch (grandfather of Hae-ri and Jun-hyeok) in the drama. His distinguishing characteristic is his explosive farting. His first wife, Hyun-kyung's own mother, died several years ago from shock after misunderstanding his relationship with a secretary. Soon-jae's romantic pursuit of Kim Ja-ok causes conflict with his family, both due to his wife's death and Soon-Jae's own inconsiderate and rash behavior with regards to his girlfriend. He is largely contemptuous of his son-in-law, whom he sees as an incompetent buffoon. He is also unreasonably jealous of Ja-ok's boarder Julien, seeing Julien as a romantic rival. He and Ja-ok get engaged and marry later in the series.
Kim Ja-ok (Kim Ja-ok)  Soon-jae's girlfriend and vice-principal of Hyun-kyung's high school. She sees herself as a highly delicate and stereotypically feminine young lady, despite her advanced years. Although her relationship with Lee Soon-jae reflects this aspect of her personality, Ja-ok is also revealed as a firm landlady and an overbearing individual in her relationship with Hyun-kyung, who is the P.E. teacher at her school. Ms. Ja-ok is the Vice Principal of the high school (also attended by Jun-hyeok), and is known as the "Pervert Vice-Principal" because she twists male students' nipples as a form of corporal punishment. Her personal tastes and behavior are that of a little girl; she sleeps with a teddy bear and decorates her room as such. She later marries Soon-jae and becomes Hyun-kyung's stepmother.
Lee Hyun-kyung (Oh Hyun-kyung)  A former taekwondo champion, Hyun-kyung is a strong willed woman who firmly runs her household. A P.E. teacher at her son's high school, she and the vice principal (Ja-ok) often have personality conflicts. She rarely takes issues personally and is a disciplinarian both at home and at work. Although thrifty, she is generous to people when the situation merits. Towards the end of the series, she becomes pregnant.
Jeong Bo-seok (Jeong Bo-seok)  Hyun-kyung's husband and the bumbling Vice President of Lee Soon-jae F&B (Food & Beverage). He is often ignored and disregarded in household matters because of his low IQ and lack of common sense. However, he is also his daughter's favorite relative, and is a man of good intentions. Unfortunately, his lack of intelligence earns him no respect within the family, particularly his father-in-law and wife. He is often a scapegoat of his father-in-law's mistakes but is also the cause of many of the company's problems. Middle-aged Japanese women find him irresistible (thus the nickname Bo-sama), and non-household members often find him initially charming. He is also good at foot volleyball; at an inter-business championship, he led his team to victory.
Lee Ji-hoon (Choi Daniel)  Hyun-kyung's brother who also lives with her family. He is perceived as cold-hearted, but he is just too preoccupied with work matters to pay close attention to those around him. He is actually a warm, lovely, and funny man with a big heart. A graduate of Seoul National University's medical school, he is a third-year surgical resident at Chorok Hospital. He is intellectually gifted and has many achievements, but does not boast or brag about them. Although he lives with his family, he is largely indifferent to household matters as his work keeps him away. He is the first in his family to reach out to Se-kyung and Shin-ae. Through a variety of comic circumstances, he also falls in love with Jun-hyeok's tutor, Hwang Jung-eum. They begin dating. But then, due to Hwang Jung-eum's difficulty, she forces Ji-hoon to break up with her. At last, Ji-hoon realizes that Se-kyung likes him, but he can't return her feeling due to he still cannot get over Jung-eum and intends to get back with her. In the last episode, it was hinted that, when he was driving Se-kyung to the airport for her flight to Tahiti, he faced a tragic car accident due to heavy rain.
Jeong Jun-Hyuk (Yoon Shi-yoon)  The tough, semi-rebellious teenage son of Lee Hyun-kyung and Jeong Bo-seok, and Hae-ri's older brother. He is lax in his studies, but is sharp and is a good judge of character. He is initially very rude to his new tutor, Jeong-eum, but later comes to accept her because of her sincerity and he begins to like her. Upon realizing Se-kyung's charms and beauty, he develops an intense crush on his noona (term for a slighter older female), willing to do anything for her. Like his uncle, he has a soft heart and is caring for others, especially the Shin sisters. Jung-eum mistakenly thinks he loves her until she sees a picture of Se-kyung in his notebook. He's known for fighting in school and is best friends with Kang Sae-ho. He is jealous of Se-kyung's attraction toward his uncle and continually tries to impress her. He succeeds in making her to like him but loses to his uncle in winning her heart.
Jeong Hae-ri (Jin Ji-hee)  Daughter of Lee Hyun-kyung and Jeong Bo-seok, and Jun-hyeok's younger sister. Hae-ri is a spoiled and selfish elementary school girl. She is initially abusive towards Shin-ae, but later grows quite attached to her, but would never verbally admit it. She has a voracious love of kalbi (a short rib dish), which often causes her constipation. She is rude to those she dislikes. As such, her trademark phrase is "bbangkkuttongkku" (빵꾸똥꾸), which approximately translates to "farty butthole"; she also speaks to elders in banmal (casual speech). Like her father, she is not academically gifted and shows little ambition to do anything other than inherit her grandfather's riches and live in wealth her entire life. It was revealed that in the future, she will be married to Se-ho.
 Shin Soo-yeon as young Jeong Hae-ri
 Park Shin-hye as adult Jeong Hae-ri
Shin Se-kyung (Shin Se-kyung)  The series centres around Se-kyung and Shin-ae's involvement with the Lee family. Se-kyung is Shin-ae's highly reserved older sister and finds work as the Lee household's live-in housekeeper after a mad escapade involving her father's debt to some loan sharks. She is diligent and frugal, but also initially lacks aspirations. She is clearly more intelligent than her position allows for and longs to go to school as her peers do. Other characters come to admire her, particularly Jun-hyeok and Julien. She is unaware of most of her virtues (including beauty) and approaches the modernity of Seoul with wide-eyed bewilderment and willingness to try new things. She knows Jun-hyeok's love for her before he reveals it. She does like Jun-hyeok, but she really loves Ji-hoon. Julien also had a crush on her from the beginning, which is revealed later in the series. She eventually quits her job to immigrate to Tahiti with her family, but it was hinted in the last episode that she faced a tragic death along with Ji-hoon who was driving her to the airport in a car accident as their car slipped due to heavy rainfall.
Shin Shin-ae (Seo Shin-ae)  Se-kyung's younger sister. Her bright-eyed enthusiasm earns her top grades at her school, despite her having been living in the backwoods of Taebaek for several years. She has boundless energy and has a close knit, loving relationship with her older sister. She has a charming personality and cuteness that wins over almost everyone she meets, with the notable exception of Hye-ri.
Kang Se-ho (Lee Gi-kwang)  Jun-hyeok's best friend and high school buddy. Academically gifted and physically fit, he quickly develops a tremendous crush on Hwang Jung-eum and becomes her merely annoying "stalker," often shutting himself in Jun-hyeok's closet during tutoring sessions to just to watch her. He is Jun-hyeok's confidant and encourages him to confess his love for Se-kyung. It was revealed that in the future, he will be married to Hae-ri.

Ja-ok's House

Hwang Jung-eum (Hwang Jung-eum)  Jun-hyuk's English tutor and boarder of Kim Ja-ok. Jung-eum is a below-average university student attending the fictitious Seoun University, a low-level university outside of Seoul. However, due to an error, Hyun-kyung mistakes her as a Seoul National University (the top public university in Korea) student and hires her as Jun-hyeok's tutor. She takes the job out of desperation, and conceals her true university enrollment as a secret for most of the series. She is fiscally irresponsible because of her obsession with being fashionable, feminine, and cute. Despite her cutesy mannerisms, Jung-eum has a strong personality that drives her to do impossible things. She falls in love with Ji-hoon through a series of incidents but initially disdains his cold and (to her) arrogant personality while also rejecting Sae-ho's teenage crush on her. She later develops a serious relationship and dates with Ji-hoon. But then she forces him to break up with her due to her financial difficulties. She eventually secures stable employment which she would perform well enough to be promoted to management 3 years later.

Julien (Julien Kang)  An American living at Kim Ja-ok's traditional Korean house. He is fluent in Korean, French, and American English. He bonds with the Shin sisters when he takes them in and helps them to find work in Seoul, and continues his friendship with the sisters after they begin living in the Lee household. He is highly attractive because of his height, model-like looks, and toned physique, and is seen constantly working out. He also becomes an English teacher at Ja-ok and Hyun-kyung's school. He also had a crush on Se-kyung in the beginning of the series.

Yoo In-na (Yoo In-na)  A carefree friend and co-boarder with Jung-eum and Julien. In-na is in a long-term relationship with Kwang-soo, and hopes to become a famous singing group with him. Although Jung-eum's friend, In-na is highly aware of her tendency to not repay loans, and mooching off others. She eventually succeeds in becoming an idol.

Lee Kwang-soo (Lee Kwang-soo)  In-na's boyfriend and Kim Ja-ok's least favorite boarder because of her prejudice against his ungainly appearance. He is kind and very supportive of his girlfriend, even though she finds success and fame without him.

Other characters

 Jung Seok-yeong as Shin Dal-hoSe-kyung and Shin-ae's father. Although he lives with his daughters in what Se-kyung accurately describes as Stone-age farming conditions in the mountains, he is quickly found by debt-sharks after being photographed on a blog and essentially drops from the story after his daughters arrive in Seoul.
 Lee Bong-won as BongDirector of Lee Soon-jae F&B. He can do Japanese translation work, and has sent his daughter to study the violin in the United States.
 Song Ju-yeon as Song Ju-yeonHae-ri and Shin-ae's elementary school teacher.
 Hong Sun-chang as Hong Sun-changThe Principal of Jun-hyeok's high school, and a rival for Ja-ok's attentions.
 Im Chae-hong as Im Chae-hongLee Soon-jae F&B's official chauffeur.
 Lee Seo-hyun as Yoon Seo-hyunA contract P.E. instructor.
 Baek Seung-hee as Baek Seung-heeSecretary to Lee Soon-jae, and thus subject to Soon-jae's explosive and smelly gas attacks.
 Choi Jae-won as Choi Jae-wonJun-hyeok's former English Tutor. Although they initially had a firm connection, Jae-won is a moocher whose uselessness (true even in comparison to Jung-eum) leads Jun-hyeok to re-evaluate Jae-won's character. Fired early on for failing to raise Jun-hyeok's poor grades.
 Doctor Min and Doctor AnJi-hoon's colleagues.

Guest and cameo appearances
 Kim Hye-seong as Lee Min-hoMinho, the elder brother of the Unstoppable High Kick Lee family, makes a cameo appearance in the first episode. He and his friend Hyeong-wook are lost in the Taebaek Mountains. They are found and taken in by the Shin family. After developing a close relationship, he takes a picture of them and uploads it to his blog. This allows the loan sharks to find Shin Dal-ho and forces Se-kyung and Shin-ae to run away to Seoul, setting the plot in motion.
 No Hyeong-wook  as No Hyeong-wookAlso a Seoul college student.
 Kwak Jeong-wook as Kwak Jeong-wookStudent at Jun-hyeok's high school.
 Park Chan-yeol
 Son Yeo-eun as Son Yeo-eunOne of Ji-hoon's early blind dates, set up for him by Hyun-kyung. Unfortunately, Yeo-eun is exposed to Ji-hoon's less-than-charming social obliviousness as he notes her jaundiced eyes and inquires in public whether her urine is brown and bubbly. Her cameo ends with her furious reaction to Ji-hoon as he ignores her to watch an important baseball game.
 Kim Jung-ryul as Kim Jung-ryul
 Song Gwi-hyeon as Song Gwi-hyeonBo-seok's father, who (in a flashback) refuses to acknowledge his son's low IQ.
 Lee Hong-ryul as  Lee Hong-ryul
 Jeong Jun-ha as Ma Dun-takJeong Jun-ha, who played an unemployed father in Unstoppable High Kick!, cameos as an incredible baseball player who was Bo-seok's rival for Hyun-kyung in college. He obviously lost Hyun-kyung's affections (having never obtained them), but went on to be a star baseball player.
 Pyo In-bong as Pyo In-bongA competition coordinator.
 Seo Ji-seok as Seo Ji-seokJi-hoon's friend.
 Park Kyung-lim as Park Kyung-limAn alum of Hyun-kyung's University, and parody of Queen of Housewives.
 Jeong Kyu-soo as Jeong Kyu-sooOwner of a sundae and tteokbokki shop in front of Hae-ri and Shin-ae's elementary school; Kyu-soo keeps Shin-ae captive for one day after Shin-ae unthinkingly eats a mass of food for his shop without knowing Hae-ri had not paid for it.
 Ryu Seung-soo as Jang Jun-hyupChorok Hospital Chief of Surgery.
 Kim Yong-jun as Kim Yong-junA veterinarian at the animal hospital.
 Kang Bit as Jeong Kyo-binHae-ri's temporary boyfriend, a Gu Jun-pyo-type character whose extravagant ways belie his youth. Although he initially pursues Hae-ri, Kyo-bin instantly falls for Shin-ae, and the elementary-school love triangle results in a Temptation of the Wife parody.
 Jung Il-woo as Jung Il-wooOriginal main character from High Kick!'''s first season, Il-woo portrays Jung-eum's first love and the original owner of her dog. Although he left her to ostensibly travel the world, his character suffered from a terminal illness and died.
 Chae Sang-woo as Chae Sang-wooAcquaintance of Shin-ae's when she is addicted to the doll-draw machine.
 Yun Ki-won as Yun Ki-wonA mentally-ill man who convinces Bo-seok that he is an agent from the year 2109, when robots have taken over the world.
 Park Ji-yeon as Lee Yu-riA tough, ulzzang high schooler who crushes on Jun-hyeok. After being rejected by him, however, she persistently pursues him until he desperately has Hwang Jung-eum pose as his girlfriend.
 Lee So-jung as Lee So-jungJi-hoon's colleague at the hospital and friend.
 Jeong Ga-eun as Jeong Ga-eun Bo-seok friend's girlfriend who went to the United States; Ga-eun is Bo-seok's first love.
 Soy as SoyAn American, Julien's friend.
 Yoon Jong-shin and Jang Han-jun as Yoon Jong-shin and Jang Han-junElders who helps Jung-eum and In-na install electronics.
 Kim Han-suk as Sa Eun-pungKnows Kwang-soo and In-na .
 Hooni Hoon as Hooni HoonHip Hop Bo-seok in the liver of the club DJ.
 Kim Bum as Kim BumA cast-member from the first season; Kim Bum is an engineering student.
 Kim Gyeong-jin  as  Kim Gyeong-jinA homeless person who received Christmas present from Hwang Jung-eum which originally was for Lee Ji-hoon.
 Kim Gyeong-ryong as Kim Gyeong-ryongOwns a prime-rib restaurant.
 Huh Cham as Lee ChamYounger brother of Soon-jae.
 Danny Ahn as Ahn Shin-wonJi-hoon's friend.
 Shin Ji as Shin JiJi-hoon's friend.
 Yang Hun as Yang Hun
 Jang Jung-hee as Jang Jung-heeChorok Hospital head nurse.
 Yang Taek-jo as Yang Taek-joGrandmother with dementia.
 Lee Na-young as Lee Na-bongJi-hoon's first love and heartbreak.
 Park Yeong-gyu as Park Yeong-gyu Kim Ja-Ok's junior.
 Jung Kyung-ho as Jung Kyung-ho
 Tiger JK as Tiger JKKwang-soo's friend.
 Jun Hwan-kyu  as Jun Hwan-kyu
 Jung Woong-in as Jung Woong-in
 Oh Sang-jin as Park Ji-sung
 Kim Tae-won as Kim Tae-won
 Cho Won-seok as Cho Won-seokAppears in In-na's music video.
 Yong Jun-hyung as himself
 Jung Suk-won as Jung Suk-won
 4Minute
 Sunwoo Yong-nyeo as Sunwoo Yong-nyeo

Awards & nominations

Original soundtrack
Part 1
 High Kick Through The Roof (지붕뚫고 하이킥) - Hooni Hoon feat. Seo Ye-na
 You Are My Girl - Kim Cho-han
 Don't Say Goodbye - Kim Cho-han
 Open Your Mind - Soul Breeze feat. Kim Cho-han

Part 2
 Hold On Your Breath (숨을 참아요) - Seo Ye-na
 The Road To Me (내게 오는 길) - Yoon Shi-yoon
 Don't Look Back, High Kick (뒤돌아 보지마 하이킥) - Kim Cho-han

Special Edition
 You're My Girl - Kim Jo-han
 Little Girl High Kick Through The Roof - Hooni Hoon feat. Seo Ye-na
 Present For You The Road To Me (Studio Version) - Yoon Shi-yoon
 Trying To Find Her - Kim Jo-han
 Don't Say Goodbye - Kim Jo-han
 Beautiful Love Friday Night - Hooni Hoon
 Scream (소리질러) - Hooni Hoon
 Say Ho - Hooni Hoon feat. Nacko
 Open Your Mind - Soul Breeze feat. Kim Jo-han
 Hold On Your Breath - Seo Ye-na

International broadcast
It aired in Japan on cable channel KNTV.

It aired in Vietnam on HTV3 in 2010. However, due to unknown reasons involving HTV3 and TVM Corp, the network temporarily lost the rights to the series. It was broadcast again in 2013.

It aired in Panama on RPC-TV in 2019.

It is set to air in Myanmar on SKYNET International Drama in upcoming 2020.

Remake
A Vietnamese adaptation of the show, Gia đình là số 1 - Phần 2'', aired on channel HTV7 in 2019. It was distributed by Điền Quân Media and Entertainment.

References

External links 
  
 

MBC TV television dramas
South Korean television sitcoms
2009 South Korean television series debuts
2010 South Korean television series endings
Korean-language television shows
South Korean comedy television series
South Korean romance television series
Television series by Chorokbaem Media